Bawaal is an upcoming Indian Hindi-language romantic period action drama film directed by Nitesh Tiwari and produced by Nadiadwala Grandson Entertainment. The film stars Varun Dhawan and Janhvi Kapoor.

Cast
 Varun Dhawan
 Janhvi Kapoor

Release
Originally this film was said to release on April 7, 2023 but got postponed due to VFX issues. All India release by Panorama Studios in collaboration with PVR Pictures and Overseas release by Yash Raj Films.

References

External links
 

Upcoming Indian films
Upcoming Hindi-language films
Films directed by Nitesh Tiwari
Indian action drama films